Władysław Łach (born 16 November 1945) is a retired Polish football manager.

References

1945 births
Living people
Polish football managers
Hutnik Nowa Huta managers
GKS Bełchatów managers
Górnik Łęczna managers
Śląsk Wrocław managers
Górnik Wieliczka managers
Stal Stalowa Wola managers